Julia Möller Roche (born 1949 in Montevideo) is a Uruguayan television presenter and former model. She is a granddaughter of the late Communist senator Julia Arévalo de Roche.

In 1969 she won the pageant Miss Uruguay and was a contestant for Miss Universe.

On television she is best remembered for her program at the end of the night, Punto Final (Spanish for "end point").

References

1949 births
Living people
Miss Universe 1969 contestants
Uruguayan female models
Uruguayan people of Norwegian descent
Uruguayan television presenters
Uruguayan women television presenters